Ramai Melvin Rumakiek (born 19 April 2002) is an Indonesian professional footballer who plays as a winger for Liga 1 club Dewa United, on loan from Persipura Jayapura, and the Indonesia national team.

Club career

Persipura Jayapura
He was signed for Persipura Jayapura to play in Liga 1 in the 2021 season. Ramai made his first-team debut on 28 August 2021 in a match against Persita Tangerang at the Pakansari Stadium, Cibinong. He also scored his first goal for the team in the 16th minute.

Ramai give assists a goal by Yohanes Pahabol in Persipura's 4–2 win over PSS Sleman on 20 March 2022. Four days later, Ramai scored his second league goal for the club, scoring in injury time of second half in a 0–4 win over PSIS Semarang at Ngurah Rai Stadium. Ramai finished the season with only 2 goals and 1 assist in 13 league appearances, Persipura Jayapura was relegated to Liga 2 next season, so this had a direct effect on the composition of their squad, many of the players then decided to move clubs, Ramai was rumored to have been approached by Persib Bandung who became his next career club in Liga 1. 

Persipura's manager Yan Mandenas announced that Ramai will remain with Persipura in 2022–23 Liga 2, he is still loyal to Persipura Jayapura because he has an unfinished contract. On 29 August, he started his match in the 2022–23 Liga 2 season for Persipura in a 4–0 home win over Kalteng Putra. On 3 September, Ramai scored his first league goal of the season in a 2–1 lose over Persiba Balikpapan. A week later, he scored in a 1–2 win over Sulut United. Eight days later, Ramai scored the winning goal in a 1–0 win over Deltras at Lukas Enembe Stadium, the latter result saw Persipura move to 1st position in the league table of east region.

Loan to Dewa United

On 25 January 2023, Ramai joined Dewa United on loan for the remainder of the 2022-23 Liga 1 season.  On 28 January, Ramai made his league debut by substituted Natanael Siringoringo in the 60th minute in a 1–1 draw against Bhayangkara.

International career
He made his official international debut on 7 October 2021, against Chinese Taipei, scoring his first international goal in a 2023 AFC Asian Cup qualification match. In November 2021, Rumakiek was called up to the Indonesia national team in a friendly match in Turkey against Afghanistan and Myanmar by Shin Tae-yong. In December 2021, he was named in Indonesian's squad for the 2020 AFF Championship in Singapore. Rumakiek scored a goal against Cambodia in a 2020 AFF Championship group stage.

Personal life
He is the younger brother of David Rumakiek, who also a footballer.

Career statistics

Club

Notes

International

International goals

Honours

International
Indonesia
 AFF Championship runner-up: 2020

References

External links
 Ramai Rumakiek at Soccerway
 Ramai Rumakiek at Liga Indonesia

2002 births
Living people
Indonesian footballers
Persipura Jayapura players
Liga 1 (Indonesia) players
Indonesia youth international footballers
Association football midfielders
Indonesia international footballers
People from Jayapura
Sportspeople from Papua